The 1993 Labatt Brier, Canada's national men's curling championship, was held from March 6 to 14 at the Ottawa Civic Centre in Ottawa, Ontario. The finals featured the all star Team Ontario, consisting of skip Russ Howard, his brother Glenn at third, second Wayne Middaugh and lead Peter Corner against a British Columbia team made up of two expatriate Brier winners in skip Rick Folk (1980 Brier champion for Saskatchewan) and third Pat Ryan (1988 & 1989 Brier champion for Alberta).

The final was won by Ontario. Thanks to steals in the third and fourth ends, they were able to hold on to a victory by a score of 5–3 in the last Brier before the adoption of the free guard zone.

Glenn Howard, Middaugh and Corner would all later compete for Ontario as skips, and both Howard and Middaugh won Briers and World championships as skips.

Teams
The 1993 Brier featured first time skips Greg Ferster of Alberta and Alan O'Leary of Nova Scotia, 1980 Brier champion Rick Folk of British Columbia, the defending 1992 Brier champion Manitoba rink skipped by Vic Peters, 2nd time Brier skips Mike Kennedy of New Brunswick and Pierre Charette of Quebec, 3rd time Brier skips Gary Oke of Newfoundland and Trevor Alexander of the Territories, 3 time Brier champion Rick Lang of Northern Ontario, 1987 Brier champion Russ Howard of Ontario, 1989 Mixed champion Robert Campbell of Prince Edward Island and 1991 Brier runners up Randy Woytowich of Saskatchewan.

Round-robin standings

Round-robin results

Draw 1

Draw 2

Draw 3

Draw 4

Draw 5

Draw 6

Draw 7

Draw 8

Draw 9

Draw 10

Draw 11

Draw 12

Draw 13

Draw 14

Draw 15

Draw 16

Draw 17

Tiebreakers
A series of tiebreakers were played between the four teams tied at first with an 8–3 record. Manitoba was seeded first, but lost both of their tiebreaker games, eliminating them from the three-team playoffs.

Round 1

Round 2

Playoffs

Semifinal

Final

Statistics

Top 5 player percentages
Round Robin only

Team percentages
Round Robin only

Notes

References

Curling in Ottawa
The Brier
Labatt Brier
1993 in Ontario
1990s in Ottawa
March 1993 sports events in Canada